The Plank is a 1967 British slapstick comedy film (51 minutes) made by Associated London Films. It follows the misadventures of two builders who require a floorboard. It was written and directed by Eric Sykes, and produced by Jon Penington. The story was based on an episode of Eric Sykes' BBC comedy series Sykes and a... from 1964, called "Sykes and a Plank".

Although not strictly a silent film, it is unusual in having little dialogue; instead, the film is punctuated by grunts, other vocal noises and sound effects.

The cast features many of the top comedians and comic actors of the time.

Plot
After one of the characters uses the last floorboard for heating, the two hapless carpenters have to buy a replacement. They return to the house with the plank on top of a Morris Eight Series E, but the journey is fraught with unexpected difficulties.

The film is a series of "plank jokes" elaborating on the "man with a plank" slapstick routine seen in vaudeville and silent films, and adding new ones. For instance, at one point the plank is tied to the top of the car and projects backward into the open back of a large van. A man (played by Roy Castle) enters the back of the van and sits down. The van drives away, leaving him suspended in mid-air sitting on the end of the plank.

Production
Two variants exist, running for about 51 and 44 minutes respectively. The film was reissued in 1974, with some scenes cut down or extended, and some put in a different order, with the music reapplied to suit; some voices were clarified.

Although a single plank was depicted throughout the film, two planks were actually used for filming: a thin plank for scenes where actors carry the plank, and a thicker plank for scenes where it is being transported on the Morris Eight and for scenes where a thicker stronger plank was required. In December 2011, one of these planks from the film was sold at auction for £1,050.

Dermot Kelly is often listed as "Concertina Man" or "Affluent Concertina Man", instead of "Milkman". Johnny Speight is often listed as "Chauffeur", "Concertina Man's Chauffeur" or "Concertina Man's Father", instead of "Pipe Smoker in Bus Queue".

Cast

See also
 The Plank (1979 film) — a television remake of this film
 Other Eric Sykes short films in a similar style to The Plank:
 Rhubarb (1969)
 Rhubarb Rhubarb (1980, a television remake of Rhubarb)
 It's Your Move (1982)
 Mr. H Is Late (1988)
 The Big Freeze (1993)

References

External links
Comedy Guide - The Plank at BBC Online

1967 comedy films
1967 films
British comedy films
Films directed by Eric Sykes
Films set in London
1960s English-language films
1960s British films